The CAVB qualification for the 2014 FIVB Volleyball Men's World Championship saw member nations compete for three places at the finals in Poland.

Draw
44 CAVB national teams entered qualification (11 teams later withdrew). The teams were distributed according to their geographical positions.

Subzonal round

Final round

The draw for the final round of competition was held in Cairo on 9 October 2013. The top three FIVB ranked teams Tunisia, Egypt and Cameroon headed the pools.

Subzonal round

Pool A
Venue:  Salle Omnisport Mohamed Nasri, Chlef, Algeria
Dates: 29–31 July 2013
All times are Central European Time (UTC+01:00).

|}

|}

Pool B
Venue:  Gimnodesportivo Vavá Duarte, Praia, Cape Verde
Dates: 4–6 July 2013
All times are Cape Verde Time (UTC−01:00).

|}

|}

Pool D
Venue:  Palais des Sports de Ouaga 2000, Ouagadougou, Burkina Faso
Dates: 24–26 July 2013
All times are Greenwich Mean Time (UTC±00:00).

|}

|}

Pool E
Venue:  Abuja Indoor Sports Hall, Abuja, Nigeria
Dates: 23–25 July 2013
All times are West Africa Time (UTC+01:00).

|}

|}

Pool F
Venue:  Palais des Sports de Diguel, N'Djamena, Chad
Dates: 4–6 July 2013
All times are West Africa Time (UTC+01:00).

|}

|}

Pool H
Venue:  MTN Arena, Kampala, Uganda
Dates: 25–27 July 2013
All times are East Africa Time (UTC+03:00).

|}

|}

Pool I
Venue:  Amahoro Indoor Stadium, Kigali, Rwanda
Dates: 25–26 July 2013
All times are Central Africa Time (UTC+02:00).

|}

|}

Pool J
Venue:  Pavilhão da Munhuana, Maputo, Mozambique
Dates: 3–6 July 2013
All times are Central Africa Time (UTC+02:00).

|}

|}

Pool K
Venue:  African Bible College, Lilongwe, Malawi
Dates: 23–25 July 2013
All times are Central Africa Time (UTC+02:00).

|}

|}

Pool L
Venue:  Palais des Sports, Victoria, Seychelles
Dates: 26–27 July 2013
All times are Seychelles Time (UTC+04:00).

|}

|}

Zonal round

Pool M
Venue:  Salle Taoufik Bouhima, Radès, Tunisia
Dates: 20–22 November 2013
All times are Central European Time (UTC+01:00).

|}

|}

Pool O
Venue:  Académie des Arts Martiaux, Niamey, Niger
Dates: 24–26 October 2013
All times are West Africa Time (UTC+01:00).

|}

|}

Pool P
Venue:  Centre sportif de Makélékélé, Brazzaville, Congo
Dates: 7–9 November 2013
All times are West Africa Time (UTC+01:00).

|}

|}

Pool Q
Venue:  Amahoro Indoor Stadium, Kigali, Rwanda
Dates: 26–30 November 2013
All times are Central Africa Time (UTC+02:00).

|}

|}

Pool R
Venue:  Institute of Health Sciences, Molepolole, Botswana
Dates: 8–12 October 2013
All times are Central Africa Time (UTC+02:00).

|}

|}

Pool S
Venue:  Gymnase Pandit-Sahadeo, Vacoas-Phoenix, Mauritius
Dates: 6 October 2013
All times are Mauritius Time (UTC+04:00).

|}

|}

Final round

Pool T
Venue:  Palais des Sports de Warda, Yaoundé, Cameroon
Dates: 13–17 February 2014
All times are West Africa Time (UTC+01:00).

|}

|}

Pool U
Venue:  Safaricom Indoor Arena, Nairobi, Kenya
Dates: 6–10 February 2014
All times are East Africa Time (UTC+03:00).

|}

|}

Pool V
Venue:  El Menzah Sports Palace, Tunis, Tunisia
Dates: 3–7 March 2014
All times are Central European Time (UTC+01:00).

|}

|}

References

External links
Official website

2014 FIVB Volleyball Men's World Championship
2013 in volleyball
2014 in volleyball